Donald E. Gettings (November 21, 1923 – June 13, 2011) was an American politician from the state of Iowa.

Education and career 
Gettings was born in Wapello County, Iowa in 1923 and graduated from Ottumwa High School in 1942. He served as a Democrat in both the Iowa House of Representatives from 1977 to 1983, and in the Iowa Senate from 1983 to 1999.

Death 
Gettings died in Ottumwa in 2011. He was interred in Shaul Cemetery in Ottumwa, Iowa.

References

|-

|-

1923 births
2011 deaths
Iowa Democrats